Eupithecia niticallis is a moth in the  family Geometridae. It is found in South Africa.

References

Moths described in 2007
niticallis
Moths of Africa